Chloromianta is a genus of moths in the family Geometridae.

Species
 Chloromianta ferruginata Warren
 Chloromianta mianta (West)

References
 Chloromianta at Markku Savela's Lepidoptera and Some Other Life Forms
 Natural History Museum Lepidoptera genus database

Geometrinae
Geometridae genera